This is a list of electoral results for the electoral district of Mount Coot-tha in Queensland state elections.

Members for Mount Coot-tha

Election results

Elections in the 2010s

Elections in the 2000s

Elections in the 1990s

Elections in the 1980s

 The two-party-preferred vote was not counted between the Liberal and Democrat candidates for Mount Coot-tha.

Elections in the 1970s

Elections in the 1960s

Elections in the 1950s

References

Queensland state electoral results by district